Gregory R. Travis (born June 7, 1963) is a Houston politician and attorney that represents District G on the Houston City Council.

Personal life
Gregory R. Travis was born on June 7, 1963. He attended Westminster College and received a bachelor's degree in business and philosophy. Additionally, he has his JD from University of Texas School of Law. He also served as an officer in the United States Air Force. Travis owns The Travis Law Firm, P.C which is law firm where he works as an attorney, he also teaches business law at Houston Community College. He has done volunteer and charity for Chain Reaction Ministries, and has been a mentor and coach for Depelchin Children’s Center, and supports animal rescue groups. He is engaged to Julie Cumley, and is a member of St. Luke's United Methodist Church.

Political career
In 2002, Travis was a candidate for district 28 of the Texas House of Representatives.

Houston City Council
Travis assumed office to represent District G of the Houston City Council on January 2 2016, succeeding Oliver Pennington. District G is the wealthiest district in Houston and is considered to be one of the wealthiest areas in the United States. Travis is currently serving his second term.

In December 2020, Travis faced criticism for posting an internet meme on his personal Facebook account depicting Michelle Obama and Melania Trump, the meme portrayed Melania Trump in a positive manner while portraying Michelle Obama negatively. Houston Black Lives Matter, among others, called for his resignation.

In October 2021, Travis announced he'd be running for a seat in the Texas House of Representatives, which was effectively an announcement of resignation from the Houston City Council because the Texas Constitution forbids council members from campaigning for another office. He left office on February 2, 2022 and was succeeded by Mary Nan Huffman.

Policies

Travis is affiliated with the Republican Party.

Overall, Travis believes that city government should be fiscally responsible and a "sturdy but quiet force." He was an opponent of the Houston HERO ordinance that was intended to be an anti-discrimination ordinance for LGBTQ Houstonians. He gained his support from the Houston Police Officers' Union by budgeting money to fund bullet proof vests for Houston Police. He has cited some of the major issues in District G is drainage, roadways, and a lack of police presence in the community. Travis supports improvements to infrastructure for bicycling in Houston. In March 2020, Travis criticized Mayor Sylvester Turner's decision to cancel the Houston Livestock Show and Rodeo due to the COVID-19 pandemic.

References

1963 births
Living people
Houston City Council members
Texas Republicans
University of Texas School of Law alumni